The Tunnunik impact crater, formerly known as the Prince Albert Impact Crater, is a recently confirmed meteorite impact crater.  It is located on Prince Albert Peninsula in the northwestern part of Victoria Island in Canada's Northwest Territories. 

The crater is estimated to have formed between 130 and 350 million years ago, and may have been created when a meteor a few kilometres in diameter struck the Earth. The desert-like landscape of impact craters like Tunnunik can be useful in understanding the geology of other rocky planets such as Mars.

It is Canada's 30th known meteorite impact feature.

Notes
 Not to be confused with the unconfirmed Victoria Island structure in California, United States.

References

External links
 University of Saskatchewan Flickr gallery

Impact craters of the Northwest Territories
Geology of the Northwest Territories
Victoria Island (Canada)